David Klinghoffer is an Orthodox Jewish author and essayist, and a proponent of the pseudoscientific idea of intelligent design. He is a Senior Fellow of the Discovery Institute, the organization that is the driving force behind the intelligent design movement. He was a frequent contributor to National Review, and a former columnist for the Jewish weekly newspaper The Forward, to which he still contributes occasional essays.

Intelligent design
Klinghoffer has published a series of articles, editorial columns, and letters to the editor in both Jewish and non-Jewish conservative publications seeking to promote the pseudoscience of intelligent design and to discredit Darwinian views of evolution.

Religion
Klinghoffer is an Orthodox Jew who has written a spiritual memoir about his religious background. He was raised in Reform Judaism by his adoptive parents, and formally converted to Orthodox Judaism, In his book, Why the Jews Rejected Jesus, Klinghoffer theorizes that Jewish rejection of Jesus allowed Christianity to separate from Judaism and become a multi-ethnic religion. Christianity was thus able to achieve a dominance in Gentile Europe that would have been impossible for Judaism to attain. To Klinghoffer, this changed world history, because Christianity was able to serve as a bulwark against the spread of Islam into Europe.

In May 2010, the Discovery Institute released a free 105-page eBook titled Signature of Controversy: Responses to Critics of Signature in the Cell, edited by Klinghoffer, with chapters by Discovery Institute fellows David Berlinski, Casey Luskin, Stephen C. Meyer, Paul Nelson, Jay Richards, and Richard Sternberg.

Bibliography

As editor
  Internet Archive link.
  [

References

Year of birth missing (living people)
Living people
Baalei teshuva
Intelligent design advocates
Discovery Institute fellows and advisors
American Orthodox Jews
Jewish American writers
Jewish counter-missionaries
American adoptees
Jewish creationists
Place of birth missing (living people)
21st-century American Jews